It's My Party was the fourth concert tour by American entertainer Jennifer Lopez. The tour was announced during her appearance on The Ellen DeGeneres Show on February 13, 2019. The North American leg of the tour began on June 7, 2019, in Inglewood, California and ended on July 27, 2019, in Miami, after performing 32 shows in Canada and the United States. Lopez then performed six international shows, starting in Tel Aviv on August 1, 2019, and ending in Saint Petersburg on August 11, 2019.

Planning, itinerary and ticketing
In December 2018, while promoting her film Second Act, Lopez announced plans to tour the United States during the summer of 2019. The tour was officially announced by the entertainer during her appearance on The Ellen DeGeneres Show on February 13, 2019. She revealed that she would be doing "a small amount of shows" throughout June and July to celebrate her 50th birthday on July 24, 2019. The dates for the 24-city North American tour, titled It's My Party: The Live Celebration, were announced shortly after her appearance on the show. The tour was scheduled to start on June 7, 2019, at the Talking Stick Resort Arena in Phoenix and end on July 26, 2019, at the American Airlines Arena in Miami. Shortly after the tour's announcement, several third-party websites began selling fake tickets to the show. Marketing specialist Shalimar Madrigal acknowledged that he was aware of these websites on February 14, 2019, and warned buyers to be careful and to only purchase tickets from official websites. Ticketmaster issued a statement on their official Twitter account on February 20, 2019, stating that "we see tickets for @JLo's #ItsMyPartyTour on other websites, but no tickets have been sold yet". On February 27, 2019, several dates were rescheduled and additional shows were added in select cities, with the tour now beginning on June 7, 2019, at The Forum in Inglewood, California. The show at the Coliseo de Puerto Rico Jose Miguel Agrelot in San Juan planned for June 28, 2019, was cancelled on March 18, 2019; a reason for the cancellation was not specified.

On March 22, 2019, the tour was re-announced as the It's My Party tour; a 25-city North American tour that begins at The Forum in Inglewood, California on June 7, 2019, and ends at the American Airlines Arena in Miami on July 25, 2019. A pre-sale for American Express cardholders began on March 26, 2019, while tickets went on sale to the general public starting on March 29, 2019. Four additional concerts were announced on March 27, 2019, bringing the total up to 29 shows. On April 5, 2019, it was reported that Lopez would be bringing the tour to Israel, which would be her first concert in the country. Israeli media had previously reported that she would be performing in Tel Aviv in 2012 and 2016, but neither one of these shows materialized. According to The Jerusalem Post, "the concert rumors were met with online campaigns by the BDS movement calling on Lopez to cancel". The concert was officially confirmed on April 17, 2019 and announced to take place on August 1, 2019. Concert prompter Mario Arlowski claimed that Lopez "had not faced any pressure from boycott activists" for the concert, which went on sale later that same day. The show was also revealed to be the first of six international concerts that Lopez would be playing during the It's My Party tour.

On April 22, 2019, it was announced that she would be performing in Moscow on August 4, 2019; tickets for the show went on sale the same day. A second show in Chicago and a third show in Miami was announced on April 29, 2019. Tickets for these two shows went on sale on May 3, 2019. Several days later, it was revealed that Lopez would be bringing the tour to the North Coast of Egypt, although the exact location and venue could not be confirmed at the time. It was announced on May 13, 2018, that Lopez would be performing in Turkey on August 6, 2019, as part of the Regnum Carya Live in Concert series. After a series of conflicting reports, the show in Egypt was officially announced on May 24, 2019, to take place on August 9, 2019, at the Seacode beach club in El Alamein. Tickets for the show were on sale before the city and venue were confirmed. On July 12, 2019, it was announced that Lopez would be performing in Spain on August 8, 2019.

Merchandise
On May 30, 2019, it was announced that Guess would serve as the official merchandise partner for the It's My Party tour. The company had previously collaborated with Lopez during their spring 2018 campaign. Dubbed as GUESS x Jennifer Lopez "It's My Party" Tour, the collection consists of a variety of concert T-shirts and a denim jacket that features a "colorful J.Lo pop art graphic on the back". Select pieces of the collection will be available at select Guess locations in the United States and Canada, as well as on the company's website, starting on June 7, 2019. The full collection will be available for sale at each show during the duration of the tour.

Commercial performance
According to The Times of Israel, Lopez's concert at Hayarkon Park in Tel Aviv on August 1, 2019 drew an audience of around 57,000.

According to Touring Data, It's My Party Tour grossed $54.5 million with 31 reported shows. Overall, the tour had a total gross of $68,387,824 million and 505,380 in attendance in 37 shows.

Awards and nominations

Set list
This set list is representative of the show on June 7, 2019, in Inglewood, California. It may not represent every show.

"Medicine"
"Love Don't Cost a Thing"
"Get Right"
"Dinero"
"I'm Real"
"Ain't It Funny"
"Jenny from the Block"
"If You Had My Love"
"Girls"
"Booty"
"Gravity"
"Limitless"
"Ain't Your Mama"
"All I Have"
"Hold It Don't Drop It"
"Te Boté" / "Te Guste"
"El Anillo"
"Waiting for Tonight"
"Dance Again"
"On the Floor"
"Let's Get Loud"

Notes
 After her concert in Montreal, Lopez performed a cover of Selena's "Si Una Vez".

Tour dates

Cancelled dates

Notes

References

2019 concert tours
Concert tours of Africa
Concert tours of Asia
Concert tours of Europe
Concert tours of Canada
Concert tours of the United States
Jennifer Lopez concert tours